is a 2007 Japanese film directed by Hideyuki Hirayama.

Plot
A courtesan (Okino) is tired of her life in Edo, and is starting to be outshone by younger women, so she tricks a man (Yaji) into helping her escape the brothel where she is bound by contract to stay.  Okino claims that her father is dying of "hearth trouble" and she needs to visit him right away.  The two pair up with an actor (Kita) who made a mess of a scene in a popular kabuki play and so cannot show his face in Edo, and the three set out to find her father.

They meet with various adventures along the way to Okino's hometown.  The rakugo story of Teresuko is intertwined with their tale, possibly referring to various kinds of trickery played by the characters on each other in trying to better their lives.

Cast
 Kanzaburo Nakamura as Yajirobee
 Akira Emoto as Kitahachi
 Kyōko Koizumi as Okino
 LaSalle Ishii as Umehachi
 Naomi Fujiyama as Osen
 Koji Kikkawa as Seijuro
 Matsunosuke Shofukutei as Yohei
 Keiko Awaji as Osan

References

External links
 

2007 films
Films directed by Hideyuki Hirayama
2000s Japanese films